This is a list of films which placed number-one at the weekend box office in Colombia during 2020. Amounts are in American dollars.

References

2020 in Colombia
2020
Colombia